Dayton Dutch Lions WFC is an American women's soccer team based in Dayton, Ohio, United States. Founded in 2011, the team plays in the Women's Premier Soccer League.

The team plays its home games at the  Dayton Outpatient Center Stadium, on the campus of West Carrollton High School in nearby West Carrollton, Ohio. The team's colors are orange, white and blue.

Year-by-year

References

USL W-League (1995–2015) teams
 
2011 establishments in Ohio
Association football clubs established in 2011
Women's sports in Ohio